The 2016–17 New Orleans Pelicans season was the 15th season of the franchise in the National Basketball Association (NBA).

Draft

All of the players drafted by the Pelicans this season would wind up being traded elsewhere sometime during the season. On June 23, 2016, both David Michineau and Diamond Stone would be traded to the Los Angeles Clippers in exchange for the Clippers' own second round pick in the draft, which was Cheick Diallo, a promising power forward who was born and raised in Mali, but ultimately played for the University of Kansas for one season before entering the 2016 NBA draft. Meanwhile, during the night of the 2017 NBA All-Star Game, the Pelicans would trade away their top pick of the draft, Buddy Hield, alongside Tyreke Evans, Langston Galloway, a Top-3 protected 2017 first round pick, and the Philadelphia 76ers' own second round pick in the 2017 NBA draft to the Sacramento Kings for their star center, DeMarcus Cousins, and Omri Casspi.

Roster

All-Star Game
The Pelicans were the hosts for the NBA All-Star Game in 2017. Anthony Davis was selected by fan voting to the starting front court for the game. Anthony Davis would also receive the All-Star Game's MVP award for his production during the All-Star Game. After the All-Star Game was over, it was announced that the Pelicans would make a blockbuster move to trade their rookie Buddy Hield, Tyreke Evans, Langston Galloway, a Top-3 protected 2017 first round pick, and the Philadelphia 76ers' own 2017 second round pick to the Sacramento Kings for fellow All-Star center DeMarcus Cousins and Omri Casspi. The move would be officially done a day later.

Standings

Division

Conference

Game log

Pre-season

|- style="background:#bfb;"
| 1
| October 1
| Dallas
| 
| Hield, Moore (19)
| Frazier, Hield (6)
| Tim Frazier (9)
| CenturyLink Center (Bossier City)6,752
| 1–0
|- style="background:#fcc;"
| 2
| October 4
| Indiana
| 
| Buddy Hield (18)
| Alexis Ajinca (8)
| Tim Frazier (7)
| Smoothie King Center15,369
| 1–1
|- style="background:#fcc;"
| 3
| October 9
| @ Houston
| 
| E'Twaun Moore (25)
| Omer Asik (14)
| Tim Frazier (9)
| Mercedes-Benz Arena (Shanghai)15,844
| 1–2
|- style="background:#fcc;"
| 4
| October 12
| Houston
| 
| Quinn Cook (20)
| Diallo, Hill (7)
| Quinn Cook (8)
| LeSports Center (Beijing)14,498
| 1–3
|- style="background:#fcc;"
| 5
| October 18
| @ Atlanta
| 
| Terrence Jones (18)
| Alexis Ajinca (7)
| Tim Frazier (6)
| Philips Arena10,866
| 1–4
|- style="background:#fcc;"
| 6
| October 20
| @ Orlando
| 
| Anthony Davis (33)
| Anthony Davis (13)
| Tim Frazier (7)
| Amway Center14,901
| 1–5

Regular season

|- style="background:#fcc"
| 1
| October 26
| Denver
| 
| Anthony Davis (50)
| Anthony Davis (16)
| Tim Frazier (11)
| Smoothie King Center15,869
| 0–1
|- style="background:#fcc"
| 2
| October 28
| Golden State
| 
| Anthony Davis (45)
| Anthony Davis (17)
| Tim Frazier (10)
| Smoothie King Center18,217
| 0–2
|- style="background:#fcc"
| 3
| October 29
| @ San Antonio
| 
| Davis, Moore (18)
| Ömer Aşık (7)
| Tim Frazier (7)
| AT&T Center18,418
| 0–3

|- style="background:#fcc"
| 4
| November 1
| Milwaukee
| 
| Anthony Davis (35)
| Anthony Davis (15)
| Tim Frazier (8)
| Smoothie King Center18,217
| 0–4
|- style="background:#fcc"
| 5
| November 2
| @ Memphis
| 
| Lance Stephenson (21)
| Ömer Aşık (11)
| Lance Stephenson (6)
| FedExForum15,881
| 0–5
|- style="background:#fcc;"
| 6 
| November 4
| Phoenix
| 
| Anthony Davis (22)
| Anthony Davis (11)
| Lance Stephenson (7)
| Smoothie King Center15,379
| 0–6
|- style="background:#fcc;"
| 7
| November 7
| @ Golden State
| 
| Anthony Davis (33)
| Anthony Davis (12)
| Tim Frazier (10)
| Oracle Arena19,596
| 0–7
|- style="background:#fcc"
| 8
| November 8
| @ Sacramento
| 
| Anthony Davis (34)
| Ömer Aşık (9)
| Tim Frazier (9)
| Golden 1 Center17,608
| 0–8
|- style="background:#cfc"
| 9
| November 10
| @ Milwaukee
| 
| Anthony Davis (32)
| Anthony Davis (8)
| Tim Frazier (10)
| BMO Harris Bradley Center12,159
| 1–8
|- style="background:#fcc"
| 10
| November 12
| LA Lakers
| 
| Anthony Davis (34)
| Anthony Davis (8)
| Tim Frazier (10)
| Smoothie King Center17,138
| 1–9
|- style="background:#cfc"
| 11
| November 14
| Boston
| 
| Anthony Davis (25)
| Anthony Davis (16)
| Tim Frazier (6)
| Smoothie King Center15,001
| 2–9
|- style="background:#fcc"
| 12
| November 16
| @ Orlando
| 
| Terrence Jones (26)
| Ömer Aşık (10)
| Buddy Hield (5)
| Amway Center16,127
| 2–10
|- style="background:#cfc"
| 13
| November 18
| Portland
| 
| Anthony Davis (38)
| Anthony Davis (9)
| Tim Frazier (8)
| Smoothie King Center15,552
| 3–10
|- style="background:#cfc"
| 14
| November 19
| Charlotte
| 
| Anthony Davis (38)
| Anthony Davis (16) 
| Jrue Holiday (9)
| Smoothie King Center15,739
| 4–10
|- style="background:#cfc"
| 15
| November 22
| @ Atlanta
| 
| Tim Frazier (21)
| Jones, Asik (6)
| Tim Frazier (14)
| Philips Arena19,120
| 5–10
|- style="background:#cfc"
| 16
| November 23
| Minnesota
| 
| Anthony Davis (42)
| Anthony Davis (10) 
| Holiday, Frazier (8)
| Smoothie King Center15,555
| 6–10
|- style="background:#fcc"
| 17
| November 25
| @ Portland
| 
| Anthony Davis (31)
| Anthony Davis (13)
| Tim Frazier (7)
| Moda Center19,393
| 6–11
|- style="background:#fcc"
| 18
| November 27
| @ Dallas
| 
| Anthony Davis (36)
| Anthony Davis (13)
| Jrue Holiday (6)
| American Airlines Center19,302
| 6–12
|- style="background:#cfc"
| 19
| November 29
| LA Lakers
| 
| Anthony Davis (41)
| Anthony Davis (16)
| Holiday, Frazier, Moore (5)
| Smoothie King Center14,024
| 7–12

|- style="background:#fcc"
| 20
| December 2
| LA Clippers
| 
| Anthony Davis (21)
| Terrence Jones (9)
| Tim Frazier (8)
| Smoothie King Center 16,538
| 7–13
|- style="background:#fcc"
| 21
| December 4
| @ Oklahoma City
| 
| Anthony Davis (37)
| Anthony Davis (15)
| Jrue Holiday (7)
| Chesapeake Energy Arena18,203
| 7–14
|- style="background:#fcc"
| 22
| December 5
| Memphis
| 
| Anthony Davis (28)
| Anthony Davis (19)
| Tim Frazier (9)
| Smoothie King Center13,795
| 7–15
|- style="background:#fcc
| 23
| December 8
| Philadelphia
| 
| Anthony Davis (26)
| Anthony Davis (11)
| Tim Frazier (6)
| Smoothie King Center14,158
| 7–16
|- style="background:#fcc
| 24
| December 10
| @ LA Clippers
| 
| Tim Frazier (20)
| Cheick Diallo (10)
| Tim Frazier (11)
| Staples Center19,090
| 7–17
|- style="background:#cfc
| 25 
| December 11
| @ Phoenix
| 
| Jrue Holiday (23)
| Anthony Davis (12)
| Tim Frazier (11)
| Talking Stick Resort Arena16,949
| 8–17
|- style="background:#fcc
| 26
| December 13
| Golden State
| 
| Anthony Davis (28)
| Terrence Jones (10)
| Tim Frazier (8)
| Smoothie King Center17,789
| 8–18
|- style="background:#cfc
| 27
| December 15
| Indiana
| 
| Anthony Davis (35)
| Anthony Davis (16)
| Jrue Holiday (14)
| Smoothie King Center15,472
| 9–18
|- style="background:#fcc
| 28
| December 16
| @ Houston
| 
| Anthony Davis (19)
| Ajinca, Jones (8)
| Tim Frazier (5)
| Toyota Center16,728
| 9–19
|- style="background:#fcc
| 29
| December 18
| @ San Antonio
| 
| Alexis Ajinca (16)
| Alexis Ajinca (8)
| Tim Frazier (7)
| AT&T Center18,615
| 9–20
|-style="background:#cfc
| 30
| December 20
| @ Philadelphia
| 
| Anthony Davis (31)
| Anthony Davis (16)
| Jrue Holiday (9)
| Wells Fargo Center 16,322
| 10–20
|- style="background:#fcc
| 31
| December 21
| Oklahoma City
| 
| Anthony Davis (34)
| Anthony Davis (15)
| Jrue Holiday (10)
| Smoothie King Center15,472
| 10–21
|- style="background:#cfc
| 32
| December 23
| Miami
| 
| Anthony Davis (28)
| Anthony Davis (22)
| Jrue Holiday (6)
| Smoothie King Center16,322
| 11–21
|- style="background:#cfc
| 33
| December 26
| Dallas
| 
| Anthony Davis (28)
| Anthony Davis (16)
| Jrue Holiday (11)
| Smoothie King Center15,764
| 12–21
|- style="background:#cfc
| 34
| December 28
| LA Clippers
| 
| Anthony Davis (20)
| Dante Cunningham (9)
| Jrue Holiday (9)
| Smoothie King Center16,647
| 13–21
|- style="background:#cfc"
| 35
| December 30
| New York
| 
| Anthony Davis (23)
| Anthony Davis (18)
| Jrue Holiday (11)
| Smoothie King Center18,124
| 14–21

|- style= "background:#fcc;"
| 36
| January 2
| @ Cleveland
| 
| Davis, Hield (20)
| Anthony Davis (17)
| Jrue Holiday (13)
| Quicken Loans Arena 20,562
| 14–22
|- style= "background:#fcc;"
| 37
| January 5
| Atlanta
| 
| Anthony Davis (20)
| Anthony Davis (19)
| Jrue Holiday (5)
| Smoothie King Center 15,003
| 14–23
|- style= "background:#fcc;"
| 38
| January 7
| @ Boston
| 
| Anthony Davis (36)
| Anthony Davis (15)
| Tyreke Evans (6)
| TD Garden18,624
| 14–24
|- style= "background:#cfc;"
| 39
| January 9
| @ New York
| 
| Anthony Davis (40)
| Anthony Davis (18)
| Jrue Holiday (7)
| Madison Square Garden19,812
| 15–24
|- style="background:#cfc;"
| 40
| January 12
| @ Brooklyn
| 
| Tyreke Evans (29)
| Terrence Jones (12)
| Jrue Holiday (4)
| Barclays Center14,352
| 16–24
|- style="background:#fcc;"
| 41
| January 14
| @ Chicago
| 
| Anthony Davis (36)
| Anthony Davis (14)
| Jrue Holiday (12)
| United Center21,916
| 16–25
|- style="background:#fcc;"
| 42
| January 16
| @ Indiana
| 
| Anthony Davis (16)
| Terrence Jones (8)
| Jrue Holiday (6)
| Bankers Life Fieldhouse15,525
| 16–26
|- style= "background:#cfc;"
| 43
| January 18
| Orlando
| 
| Anthony Davis (21)
| Anthony Davis (14)
| Evans, Holiday (5)
| Smoothie King Center 15,818
| 17–26
|- style= "background:#fcc;"
| 44
| January 20
| Brooklyn
| 
| Anthony Davis (22)
| Anthony Davis (9)
| Jrue Holiday (8)
| Smoothie King Center 17,004
| 17–27
|- style= "background:#cfc;"
| 45
| January 23
| Cleveland
| 
| Terrence Jones (36)
| Terrence Jones (11)
| Jrue Holiday (10)
| Smoothie King Center 17,758
| 18–27
|- style= "background:#fcc;"
| 46
| January 25
| Oklahoma City
| 
| E'Twaun Moore (18)
| Moore, Hill (8)
| Tyreke Evans (9)
| Smoothie King Center 15,277
| 18–28
|- style= "background:#cfc;"
| 47
| January 27
| San Antonio
| 
| Jrue Holiday (23)
| Anthony Davis (22)
| Jrue Holiday (11)
| Smoothie King Center 17,757
| 19–28
|- style= "background:#fcc;"
| 48
| January 29
| Washington
| 
| Anthony Davis (36)
| Anthony Davis (17)
| Jrue Holiday (11)
| Smoothie King Center 16,779
| 19–29
|- style="background:#fcc;"
| 49
| January 31
| @ Toronto
| 
| Jrue Holiday (30)
| Anthony Davis (17)
| Terrence Jones (4)
| Air Canada Centre19,800
| 19–30

|- style="background:#fcc;"
| 50
| February 1
| @ Detroit
| 
| Anthony Davis (31)
| Anthony Davis (12)
| Jrue Holiday (11)
| Palace of Auburn Hills14,262
| 19–31
|- style="background:#fcc;"
| 51
| February 4
| @ Washington
| 
| Anthony Davis (25)
| Davis, Holiday (10)
| Jrue Holiday (8)
| Verizon Center19,651
| 19–32
|- style="background:#cfc;"
| 52
| February 6
| Phoenix
| 
| Anthony Davis (34)
| Davis, Holiday, Jones (9)
| Jrue Holiday (7)
| Smoothie King Center15,888
| 20–32
|- style="background:#fcc;"
| 53
| February 8
| Utah
| 
| Terrence Jones (21)
| Anthony Davis (10)
| Tim Frazier (4)
| Smoothie King Center14,508
| 20–33
|- style= "background:#cfc;"
| 54
| February 10
| @ Minnesota
| 
| Anthony Davis (42)
| Anthony Davis (13)
| Jrue Holiday (12)
| Target Center 16,093
| 21–33
|- style="background:#fcc;"
| 55
| February 12
| @ Sacramento
|  
| Anthony Davis (32)
| Anthony Davis (10)
| Jrue Holiday (11)
| Golden 1 Center17,608
| 21–34
|- style="background:#cfc;"
| 56
| February 13
| @ Phoenix
| 
| Anthony Davis (24)
| Anthony Davis (10)
| Jrue Holiday (8)
| Golden 1 Center16,321
| 22–34
|- style="background:#cfc;"
| 57
| February 15
| @ Memphis
| 
| Jrue Holiday (19)
| Alexis Ajinca (10)
| Jrue Holiday (7)
| FedExForum16,145
| 23–34
|- style="background:#fcc;"
| 58
| February 23
| Houston
| 
| Anthony Davis (29)
| DeMarcus Cousins (14)
| Hill, Frazier, Cousins (5)
| Smoothie King Center18,470
| 23–35
|- style="background:#fcc;"
| 59
| February 25
| @ Dallas
| 
| Anthony Davis (39)
| DeMarcus Cousins (15)
| Cousins, Holiday (6) 
| American Airlines Center20,411
| 23–36
|- style="background:#fcc;"
| 60
| February 26
| @ Oklahoma City
| 
| Anthony Davis (38)
| DeMarcus Cousins (10)
| Jrue Holiday (8)
| Chesapeake Energy Arena18,203
| 23–37

|- style="background:#cfc;"
| 61
| March 1
| Detroit
| 
| Anthony Davis (33)
| Anthony Davis (14)
| Jrue Holiday (5)
| Smoothie King Center14,406
| 24–37
|-style="background:#fcc;"
| 62
| March 3
| San Antonio
| 
| Anthony Davis (29)
| DeMarcus Cousins (23)
| Jrue Holiday (5)
| Smoothie King Center17,669
| 24–38
|-style="background:#cfc;"
| 63
| March 5
| @ LA Lakers
| 
| DeMarcus Cousins (31)
| Anthony Davis (12)
| Jrue Holiday (12)
| Staples Center18,997
| 25–38
|-style="background:#fcc;"
| 64
| March 6
| @ Utah
| 
| Anthony Davis (20)
| Anthony Davis (12)
| Frazier, Holiday, Cousins, Crawford (3)
| Vivint Smart Home Arena19,649
| 25–39
|-style="background:#fcc;"
| 65
| March 8
| Toronto
| 
| DeMarcus Cousins (25)
| DeMarcus Cousins (10)
| Jrue Holiday (6)
| Smoothie King Center14,543
| 25–40
|-style="background:#cfc;"
| 66
| March 11
| @ Charlotte
| 
| Anthony Davis (46)
| Anthony Davis (21)
| Jrue Holiday (13)
| Spectrum Center18,196
| 26–40
|- style="background:#cfc;"
| 67
| March 14
| Portland
| 
| DeMarcus Cousins (22)
| Anthony Davis (15)
| Tim Frazier (7)
| Smoothie King Center15,530
| 27–40
|- style="background:#fcc;"
| 68
| March 15
| @ Miami
| 
| Anthony Davis (27)
| DeMarcus Cousins (9)
| Jrue Holiday (8)
| American Airlines Arena19,678
| 27–41
|- style="background:#cfc;"
| 69
| March 17
| Houston
| 
| Solomon Hill (30)
| Anthony Davis (15)
| Solomon Hill (7)
| Smoothie King Center17,972
| 28–41
|- style="background:#cfc;"
| 70
| March 19
| Minnesota
| 
| Anthony Davis (28)
| DeMarcus Cousins (11)
| Tim Frazier (8)
| Smoothie King Center16,111
| 29–41
|- style="background:#cfc;"
| 71
| March 21
| Memphis
|  
| DeMarcus Cousins (41)
| DeMarcus Cousins (17)
| Jrue Holiday (6)
| Smoothie King Center15,973
| 30–41
|- style="background:#fcc;"
| 72
| March 24
| @ Houston
| 
| Anthony Davis (33)
| Anthony Davis (16)
| Jrue Holiday (9) 
| Toyota Center18,055
| 30–42
|- style="background:#cfc;"
| 73
| March 26
| @ Denver
|  
| Anthony Davis (31)
| Anthony Davis (15)
| Tim Frazier (8)
| Pepsi Center19,850
| 31–42
|- style="background:#fcc;"
| 74
| March 27
| @ Utah
| 
| Anthony Davis (36)
| Anthony Davis (17)
| Tim Frazier (6)
| Vivint Smart Home Arena18,924
| 31–43
|- style="background:#cfc;"
| 75
| March 29
| Dallas
| 
| Anthony Davis (29)
| Anthony Davis (16)
| Jrue Holiday (7) 
| Smoothie King Center16,000
| 32–43
|- style="background:#cfc;"
| 76
| March 31
| Sacramento
| 
| DeMarcus Cousins (37)
| DeMarcus Cousins (13)
| Jrue Holiday (8)
| Smoothie King Center17,304
| 33–43

|- style="background:#fcc;"
| 77
| April 2
| Chicago
| 
| Anthony Davis (30)
| DeMarcus Cousins (18)
| Jrue Holiday (6)
| Smoothie King Center18,306
| 33–44
|- style="background:#fcc;"
| 78
| April 4
| Denver
| 
| Anthony Davis (41)
| DeMarcus Cousins (14)
| Jrue Holiday (13)
| Smoothie King Center16,050
| 33–45
|- style="background:#fcc;"
| 79
| April 7
| @ Denver
| 
| Anthony Davis (25)
| Alexis Ajinca (7)
| Jrue Holiday (7)
| Pepsi Center16,348
| 33–46
|- style="background:#fcc;"
| 80
| April 8
| @ Golden State
| 
| Jordan Crawford (19)
| Cheick Diallo (9)
| Jrue Holiday (10)
| Oracle Arena19,596
| 33−47
|- style="background:#fcc;"
| 81
| April 11
| @ L.A. Lakers
|  
| Cheick Diallo (19)
| Cheick Diallo (11)
| Crawford, Holiday (7)
| Staples Center18,997
| 33–48
|- style="background:#cfc;"
| 82
| April 12
| @ Portland
| 
| Jordan Crawford (15)
| Cheick Diallo (16)
| Tim Frazier (8)
| Moda Center19,521
| 34–48

Transactions

Trades

Free agency

Re-signed

Additions

Subtractions

References

New Orleans Pelicans seasons
New Orleans Pelicans
New Orleans Pelicans
New Orleans Pelicans